The following is a list of characters from the animated television series, Shadow Raiders.

Planet Rock
Planet Rock is a planet made up mostly rocks. That contain many types of minerals. The appearance of people of planet, look mostly like humans made of stone, with patterns on their bodies and their hair that look like jewels. Planet Rock is the second planet to join the Interplanetary Alliance.

Graveheart
At the beginning of the series, Graveheart is a simple miner working for Lord Mantel. However, when discovering Tekla and being ambushed by Beast Drones on Planet Ice during routine exporting, Graveheart realizes he must step into the leader seat and bring the worlds together to stop a common enemy.  He is a very noble, brave man, though he often suffers from lack of self-confidence, deeming himself as "just a miner and nothing more". When put into battle, he immediately takes charge and commands his troops with authority and skill. Those around him respect him to the fullest. Formerly a Quarrior (a portmanteau of warrior and quarry, he quit Planet Rock's military when he failed to save his younger brother, Mica, during a raid on Planet Fire. He often has his doubts about himself, but Jade is always there to reassure him of his abilities. Graveheart was exiled from Planet Rock when he formed the Alliance, leaving himself and Jade as the only two citizens of Rock in the group. Notably, he wears a black version of the standard Miner's armor. What this means is never revealed, but he calls the Miners "his men". He also called "sir" by the other miners, implying he is of a higher rank, most likely a miner foreman. He is voiced by Paul Dobson. His name and design is a reference to the movie, “Braveheart”.

Jade
Tough and uncompromising, Jade is Captain of the Guard of Planet Rock and Graveheart's best friend.  She loves Graveheart very much, though she is unwilling to admit it.  While working with the Alliance, her loyalties lie with Planet Rock first and foremost.  Lord Mantel was very reluctant to exile Jade as she had asked, but agreed to it for her to be able to watch over the Alliance.  Jade rarely shows her feelings, but what she has shown is a great dislike for Emperor Femur.  After Lord Mantel's death at Blokk's hands, Jade underwent a psychological test and became ruler of Planet Rock.  She is voiced by Enuka Okuma.

Lord Mantel
The ruler of Planet Rock, a harsh and merciless man.  He is unwavering in his beliefs that Planet Rock is superior to all other planets.  This forces him to refuse Rock's participation in the Alliance.  He is stubborn and arrogant, but quite well liked on the planet. In exchange for lending the Battle Moons to the Alliance, he has Jade collect information on it and eventually got its command codes. With Graveheart gone on the Prison Planet, Mantle uses the Battle Moons to attack the Beast Planet to prove Rock is superior, leaving the planet defenseless. He is eventually killed by Blokk after the Beast Planet invades his planet. His funeral is later made but his deception is kept a secret otherwise it would demoralize the Alliance. He is voiced by Blu Mankuma.

Commander Feldspar
The commander of Planet Rock's military and guardian to the entrance of Lord Mantel's fortress.  He commands Planet Rock's Battle-Moons; he also takes over Jade's duties after she is exiled.  He doesn't believe in or trust the Alliance.  After the Beast Planet's invasion, he is brutally killed by Blokk.  He is voiced by Alec Willows.

Planet Ice
Planet Ice is made up mostly of ice, which is stolen to be used for water. The people of Plant Ice take the appearance of blue insectoid's. Planet Ice is the first planet to become part of the Interplanetary Alliance.

King Cryos
The wise and admirable king of Planet Ice, Cryos is admired by all of his people for his intelligence.  Although he seems quiet at a glance, he is very thoughtful and the brains behind the Alliance.  He is also one of the founding members, as he is one of the first to realize the threat that the Beast Planet is able to cause.  He truly believes that peace between all of the worlds can be established, but that everyone must work hard for it.  Because of their similar beliefs, Cryos and Graveheart become very close friends throughout the series.  Cryos is also constantly worrying over his daughter, Zera's, safety.  Regardless, he never hesitates to engage the minions of the Beast Planet in battle, and is a very capable tactician and a valuable asset to the Alliance.  He is voiced by Mark Oliver.

Lady Zera
The curious and childish daughter of King Cryos, Lady Zera is a dreamer and wishes she could go on adventures like her father.  Often, she'll stow away on her father's vehicles, but he always finds her.  She can act quite arrogant at times, but she is actually quite caring and sweet.  Jade eventually teaches her how to battle so she can be safe while her father is on Alliance missions and Zera, like her father, is a skilled sharpshooter.  She also builds a very close friendship with the prince of Planet Fire, Pyrus.  She is voiced by Tegan Moss.

Commander Medstar
Besides the royal family, he is the highest-ranking member of Planet Ice. He was made king temporarily when Cryos stepped down, he then gives the throne back to Cryos just before the fight against Remora. He is voiced by Garry Chalk

Planet Fire
Planet Fire is known for it fire energy, and is mostly made up of volcanoes and lava pools. The people of Planet Fire are humanoid with different body types, what is common between all of them is that they have fire on the top of their heads. Planet Fire is the third plant to join the Interplanetary Alliance.

Prince Pyrus
The young and naive prince of Planet Fire, Pyrus took on the responsibility of ruling his world at a very young age.  His father died when he was quite little, and ever since then, Pyrus was raised by the Vizier.  He is a very kind, compassionate individual, but he can revert to a childish mood when set off.  He's very quick-tempered, and tends to do things without thinking them through.  Regardless, he is always putting the people of his planet first, which makes for a great leader.  When first approached about the Alliance, Pyrus enthusiastically joined, and was quick to realize the threat of the Beast Planet.  Pyrus gets along very well with mostly everyone from the Alliance, particularly Zera and Femur; he is the only member of the Alliance who trusts Femur, initially refusing to believe that Femur was retreating from the Remora battle.  He is voiced by Matt Hill.

The Grand Vizier
Prince Pyrus' royal counselor and surrogate father, the Vizier is a rough, untrusting old man.  He is a firm believer in old tradition and the way things were in the past, and is very loyal and protective of his prince.  He eventually sacrifices his life in hopes of destroying the Beast Planet, but before he dies, he witnesses Graveheart save Pyrus' life, and realizes the Alliance will give Pyrus a new home. The Beast soon recreates him and Planet Fire, so as to lure its inhabitants to be fed to it. However, it made a few flaws in the faux Vizer, such as his former mistrust of the Alliance. When Pyrus realized the truth, he allowed the faux Vizer to fall into an ocean of null energy, destroying the planet. The Vizier has several similarities to Captain Ahab from Moby Dick and his last words "For my planet's sake, I spit my last breath at thee". are almost the same as Ahab's final words before his own death. He is voiced by Jim Byrnes.

Captain Blaze
The captain of the Igneous Knights and of Pyrus's personal guard he is loyal in equal amounts to the heart of fire and to his prince. He is seen several times and at one stage he commands a battle moon to attack the beast planet so as to "go out in a blaze of glory", he also takes the bone emperor Femur along with him. However, when the prince is attacked by beast drones when attempting to follow him and bring him back Blaze realises that he cannot let his prince die and returns just in time to save the day. He is voiced by Michael Dobson

Planet Bone
Planet Bone is known for is earth and rich soil and is mostly made up of swamps. A common thing to do on bone is to kill the current emperor and take over. Most of the people on Planet Bone are reptilian. Planet Bone is the fourth and final planet to join the Interplanetary Alliance.

Emperor Femur
The Emperor of Planet Bone, Femur is a short, fat, obnoxious reptilian creature who is constantly scheming of new ways to benefit himself.  He is a very crafty, vile man with self-gratification as the only thing on his mind.  Despite being self-indulgent, Femur cares for his planet and does indeed think of the citizens of Bone, and he willingly and paternally looks after the last surviving plant from Planet Jungle.  Not a fighter by any means, Femur instead chooses to hide in the midst of battle, and in the crucial battle of Remora he led his troops in a retreat when things got rough.  He is also very flirtatious with the ladies, particularly Jade (much to her disdain). He genuinely cares for Pyrus and serves as a surrogate uncle-type figure, trying to keep him out of battles and being upset at the thought of being assassinated without patching things up with Pyrus. He is voiced by Garry Chalk.

Pelvus
Femur's royal servant, the flamboyant Pelvus is just as vile as his emperor.  He is always plotting Femur's demise, as according to a popular rhyme on Bone, "Ya snag the throne, ya rule on Bone/He who dies is food for the flies" . Femur always escapes every death trap Pelvus sets for him. Quite incompetent, Pelvus is also a coward, something he and Femur have in common.  However, Pelvus keeps a wide array of weaponry on him at all times.  He is voiced by Scott McNeil.

Sternum
Femur's brother and the former emperor of Bone. Rather than risk his brother making an attempt on his life and being the next in line for the throne, Sternum ordered Femur to be executed. Femur then bribed the guards to release him, and had Pelvus drug Sternum, thus securing the throne in typical Bone fashion. But instead of killing his brother, Femur had Sternum shipped off to the Prison Planet. He became quite a hero on the Prison Planet, leading a group of escaped prisoners; he showed a noble air and formed a quick relationship with Jade. When he returns to Planet Bone, he appears to reconcile with his brother. In the Prison Planet, Sternum was tortured, and when, Femur says, "Hey, you're still alive. It couldn't have been that bad". Sternum thinks that Femur obviously does not understand how bad it was. Sternum obviously would rather die than to go through the endless torture again, and almost kills Femur for his misunderstanding. When he returns to the Cluster after sacrificing the Prison Planet to teleport the Beast Planet away, Sternum asks Pelvus on information of the Alliance, implying that he intends to take over. Pelvus relays this to Femur but the Emperor believes that his brother has changed, and brushes off the notion. Sternum appears less reptilian and more human than other Bone characters. As he was designed to look muscular and human, his tendrils under his mouth are so short that it looks like he has a chin with three clefts. He is voiced by John Payne.

Planet Tek
Planet Tek only appears in a few scenes at the beginning of the series and in flashbacks. Based on Tekla's appearance, the people of the planet would’ve been made of metal, or chrome, making them look robotic.

Tekla
The sole survivor and princess of Planet Tek, she was found by Graveheart and Cryos, who vowed to help her in any way they could.  After slipping into a coma, she was possessed by Lamprey, who used her body to try and destroy the Alliance.  Regaining herself, Tekla became a valuable member of the Alliance thanks to her broad knowledge.  Though she is not a very powerful fighter, she can hold her own in battle.  She is voiced by Donna Yamamoto.

Voxx
Tekla's mechanical sphere that floats around her and fills her in on the surroundings and any other information she may need to know.  It is always at her side, and learns anything it can possible in the process.  In "Night on the town" Tekla describes Voxx as an "Action Computer" when Jade refers to it as a toy. This is likely an in-joke, as Voxx's shape and size are identical to Planet Tek from the original War Planets toy line.

The Beast Planet
The Beast Planet is the main antagonist of the show. By using its ability to create Beast Drones  and alongside its Beast Generals, they crush the defenses of a planet so that the Beast Planet can eat it.

Blokk
One of the Beast Generals sent to conquer any planets they could get their hands on, Blokk was a firm believer in the brute force method. He gets carried away quite easily, and is definitely not as intelligent as Lamprey - if he had his way, he would launch an all-out assault on the Alliance and wipe them out with his Beast Drones. Despite this, Blokk is one of the Beast's most formidable warriors, being armed with a pair of jagged claws on each forearm. He also lacks the frailty of his drone subordinates, having no obvious weak points to destroy.

After their failure in the first season, Blokk and Lamprey returned to the Beast Planet and were tortured and beaten. However, at the end of the series, he invades the underdefended Planet Rock, killing Lord Mantel and several inhabitants before challenging Graveheart to a final battle in the planet's World Engine. Blokk meets his end at Graveheart's hands when a forcefield generator is shoved into his body, disintegrating him from within.

Blokk had a habit of "jittering" his skull during the first season, but stopped when Lamprey told him that it annoyed her. Late during season two he regained his "jitter" whenever he became angered. He is voiced by Scott McNeil.

Lamprey
One of the Beast Generals sent to conquer any planets they could get their hands on, Lamprey is much more level-headed than Blokk, often bickering with him on the best way to proceed. She favored more subtle tactics than Blokk, using manipulation to create inner turmoil amongst the Alliance. In combat, Lamprey can use the tendrils on her arms as whips or blades.

Her main plan was to possess Tekla and turn the Alliance members against each other.  The plan failed, but Lamprey continued to taunt the group, until the destruction of Remora sent her and Blokk back to the Beast Planet for punishment. In Lamprey's last appearance in the series, she makes another attempt on Tekla's life, but is instead engaged in combat with Jade. She accidentally crushes herself underneath a collapsing ceiling in the melee, killing her, though after the fight, no sign of Lamprey remains underneath the rubble. Her fate is left uncertain. She is voiced by Tasha Simms.

Voyd
One of the Beast Generals sent to conquer any planets they could get their hands on. Voyd outranks Blokk and Lamprey, and thus acts as the deciding vote on which of their plans to carry out. Additionally, he is able to act as an interdimensional transport, teleporting Blokk and Lamprey to safety when able to. Being significantly larger than Blokk and Lamprey, Voyd is assumed to be much more powerful than both of them, and is the one being besides the Beast Planet they both fear. He is a mysterious being that never speaks, and appears primarily in the first season. He later appears on a monitor within Blokk's fighter during the second season. Voyd does not have a "jaw" (unlike Blokk and Lamprey), which may be the reason why he never talks. He, however, still make grunts similar to that of Beast Drones.

The fact that Lamprey is female, Blokk is male and Voyd is of indeterminate gender may be seen as significant in their positions and in the way they prefer to work.

Beast Drones
The mindless infantry of the Beast Planet's forces, consisting of null matter condensed around a crescent-shaped containment unit. They can be killed instantly by destroying their containment units, but make up for it through sheer numbers and deadly null-matter blasters on their left arms.

Planet Sand

Zuma
A peaceful inhabitant of Planet Sand, Zuma is native and unfamiliar to the other worlds.  She knows only what she learned, and has very powerful telepathic abilities. She joins the Alliance as a representative of her planet. However, she finds it difficult to be separated from her "kindred". She is voiced by Ellen Kennedy.

Ramset
The apparent leader of the Sun people, a small humanoid who moves about in an imposing suit of gold armor.  He thought that the Sand people were unable to communicate until Zuma first "spoke" to him. He is voiced by Grahame Andrews

Prison Planet

Jewelia
Like Sternum, Jewelia is a leader of the escaped prisoners of the Prison Planet. She is manipulative, yet charming, and is very accustomed to getting her way. Her name is pronounced "Julia".  She becomes a thorn in the Alliance's side. However, unlike Sternum and most of the other inhabitants of the Prison Planet, she doesn't want to leave; she wants to take over the planet and rule it. Although not explicitly stated, it can be assumed that she is a member of Planet rock, based on her name and physiology. Whereas other characters have some sort of clothes/armor (with the exception of Tekla), Jewelia appears to have neither. Her heels appear as though a part of her body, rather than shoes. She is voiced by Janyse Jaud.

See also
 War Planets
 Shadow Raiders
 Trendmasters makers of War Planets
 Mainframe Studios (formerly Mainframe Entertainment), the production company of Shadow Raiders

Shadow Raiders